The  is an economic organization founded in May 2002 by amalgamation of Keidanren (Japan Federation of Economic Organizations, established 1946; name sometimes used alone as abbreviation for whole organization) and Nikkeiren (Japan Federation of Employers' Associations, established 1948), with Nikkeiren being absorbed into Keidanren.

The federation is commonly referred to as "Keidanren", its 1,601 members consist of 1,281 companies, 129 industrial associations, and 47 regional economic organizations (as of June 15, 2010).

For most of the post-war period, Keidanren has been the voice of big business in Japan and is generally considered the most conservative of the country's three major private sector led business associations. The other two organizations are the Japan Chamber of Commerce and Industry (日本商工会議所) and the Japan Association of Corporate Executives (経済同友会).

According to the organization's official website, the mission of the Keidanren is to: accelerate growth of Japan's and the world's economy, and to strengthen the corporations to create additional value to transform the Japanese economy into one that is sustainable and driven by the private sector by encouraging the ideas of individuals and local communities.

The current chairman is Masakazu Tokura of Sumitomo Chemical. He has been chairman of The Japan Business Federation since June 2021.

Political donations

Keidanren and its predecessor bodies had a long history of providing substantial political donations to the Liberal Democratic Party. In the lead-up to the 2009 general election the Democratic Party of Japan made a pledge to ban political donations from companies and organizations. After the DPJ victory in that election, Keidanren stopped making political donations.

View on consumption tax
Keidanren supported the Noda government's efforts to raise Japan's consumption tax from 5% to 10%. It had previously called for the consumption tax to be raised even higher, to 15%.

Views on nuclear power
After the March 11 nuclear disaster and subsequent shutdown of all the nuclear plants in Japan, Keidanren called for their restart. This view was not shared by all business leaders, with Rakuten president Hiroshi Mikitani leaving the federation partly over this issue. Masayoshi Son of Softbank publicly objected to the focus on restarting the nuclear plants, but didn't leave the federation over it.

Changes to board composition
In 2002, when Keidanren took on its current form, two-thirds of its 18 vice-chairmen were from manufacturing companies. As of July 2012, only 8 of the 18 are filled by executives of manufacturers.

Yahoo! Japan
Yahoo! Japan was a founding member of Rakuten CEO Hiroshi Mikitani's Japan e-business association in February 2010, but after Rakuten withdrew from Keidanren in June 2011 and made moves to become the Japan Association of New Economy as a rival to Keidanren, Yahoo! Japan withdrew from the e-business association in March 2012. It joined Keidanren in July 2012.

Current board

Below are the lists of presidents, Chair, Vice-presidents and Vice-Chairs of Japan Business Federation (as of July 1, 2021).

Past officeholders

See also 
Chamber of commerce
List of employer associations
 Union of Industrial and Employers' Confederations of Europe (UNICE), a similar European business association

References

External links
 
 https://www.keidanren.or.jp/en/
 http://www.keidanren-usa.org/

Organizations established in 2002
2002 establishments in Japan
Organizations based in Tokyo
Chiyoda, Tokyo
Business organizations based in Japan
Professional associations based in Japan
Employers' organizations in Japan
Advocacy groups in Japan